Events in the year 2023 in Lebanon.

Incumbents

Events

January 

 January 22 – The Lebanese Army declares a "state of alert" after stopping Israeli bulldozers and accompanying soldiers from approaching a border fence in Southern Lebanon. Peacekeeping forces from UNIFIL have also been deployed to the area. 
 January 23 – Judge Tarek Bitar resumes his investigation into the explosion, 13 months after Hezbollah officials filed complaints against Bitar that prompted him to suspend the investigation.

February 

 February 1 – Lebanese liquidity crisis: The central bank of Lebanon devalues the Lebanese pound by 90% amid an ongoing financial crisis. 
February 14 – 3 soldiers are ambushed killed by narco-terrorists in the Beqaa region.
February 16 – Protesters set fires and break windows to banks in Beirut as the Lebanese pound devalues by more than 98%.

Scheduled 

 2022–2023 Lebanese presidential election

Sports 

 2022–23 Lebanese FA Cup

Deaths 

 January 11 – Hussein el-Husseini, 85, politician, speaker of the parliament (1984–1992).
 February 14– Marwan G. Najjar, 76, scriptwriter and producer.

References 

 

2023 in Lebanon
2020s in Lebanon
Years of the 21st century in Lebanon
Lebanon
Lebanon